Back to the Bus is a compilation of Funeral for a Friend's favourite songs released on 26 March 2007.

Track listing

References 

 PLAY.com: 
 BBC Wales Music: https://web.archive.org/web/20071218214547/http://www.bbc.co.uk/wales/music/sites/funeralforafriend/pages/back_to_the_bus.shtml

2007 compilation albums